Karate at the 2014 Asian Games was held in Gyeyang Gymnasium, Incheon, South Korea between October 2 and 4, 2014.

Schedule

Medalists

Men

Women

Medal table

Participating nations
A total of 172 athletes from 32 nations competed in karate at the 2014 Asian Games:

References

External links
 Official website for karate at the 2014 Asian Games

 
2014 Asian Games events
2014
Asian Games
2014 Asian Games